Walter Reiser (born 29 December 1923) was a Swiss cyclist. He competed in the individual and team road race events at the 1948 Summer Olympics. He also rode in the 1951 and the 1952 Tour de France.

References

External links
 

1923 births
Swiss male cyclists
Olympic cyclists of Switzerland
Cyclists at the 1948 Summer Olympics
People from Frauenfeld
Sportspeople from Thurgau